Wanastowi Vjecy is a Czech rock band formed in 1988 in Prague. The group consists of Robert Kodym on vocals and guitar, Štěpán Smetáček on drums, Tomáš Vartecký on guitar, and Radek Havlíček on bass. They began as a punk band but settled into a mainstream rock sound by the early 1990s. Kodym and former member P.B.CH. were also in the band Lucie, led by David Koller, which they had formed together in 1985. The duo formed the core of Wanastowi Vjecy until 2010, when P.B.CH. left.

History
Wanastowi Vjecy formed in 1988 as a studio project to record music for a forthcoming documentary about punk music in Prague. Their original lineup consisted of Kodym on guitar and vocals, Petr Břetislav Chovanec (more commonly known as P.B.CH.) on bass and vocals, and Adolf Vitáček on drums. They wrote four songs for the project, which were released on a 1990 punk compilation by various artists, titled Epidemie (Epidemic). Three of the tracks made it to their debut album Tak mi to teda nandey (Give It to Me Then), released in 1991. The album had a punk vibe to it but mainly tended towards a generic rock sound. Ivan Polák recorded the drums on the record.

The band's second album, Lži, sex & prachy (Lies, Sex & Money) was released in 1992, followed by Divnoalbum (Strange Album), a compilation of remixes, live recordings, and instrumental compositions, in 1993. Lucie had been on a brief hiatus since 1992, and as they reformed the following year, Wanastowi Vjecy was shelved in turn.

The project returned in 1996 with the album Andělé (Angels), which had a rawer sound than their previous offerings. The following year saw the release of 333 stříbrnejch stříkaček (333 Silver Sprinklers - a common Czech tongue twister). The band toured with the album, then did an acoustic Christmas set, and again paused activities to focus on the efforts of their sister group Lucie.

Wanastowi Vjecy released their next album, Hračky (Toys), in April 2000, but it proved less successful than their earlier work. Due to their commitment to Lucie, the band did not do a tour for the album. In September 2001, they issued the compilation Ty nejlepší věci (The Best Things) on the tenth anniversary of the release of their debut album. Guitarist Tomáš Vartecký at this time also played with Daniel Landa and David Koller's Kollerband.

In the spring of 2003, Lucie keyboardist Michal Dvořák was fired and replaced by Tomáš Vartecký. David Koller left Lucie in 2005. Kodym, P.B.CH., and drummer Martin Vajgl (-123 min) began preparing a new album. It saw the light of day in the fall of 2006 under the title Torpédo. In the spring of 2007, an extensive concert tour was to take place, but due to problems with logistics and a change of management, only one show was held in London. The same year, the 2-CD + DVD compilation Best of 20 let (Best of 20 Years) was released. In 2018, the band performed at Prague's Sazka Arena in celebration of their 20-year anniversary, and this was followed by a concert tour.

The band then went on a 2-year hiatus, and in 2010 announced the departure of founding member P.B.CH. The musician stated that he wanted to devote himself to his own projects as well as the creation of film music. The same year, Kodym revealed that drummer Štěpán Smetáček and bassist Radek Havlíček had joined the band. Both musicians had been active in the band during the first half of the 90s. In this new lineup, two concerts took place in 2011.

In the autumn of 2011, the first album without P.B.CH. was released under the title Letíme na Wenuši (Let's Fly to Venus).

In April 2012, the group embarked on a tour that included, in addition to Czech cities, two stops in Slovakia.

In 2016, Wanastowi Vjecy released their eighth studio album, titled Alchymie (Alchemy).

In 2018, Lucie officially reformed in its best-known formation of Kodym, P.B.CH., Koller, and Dvořák after a 16-year hiatus, and released the album EvoLucie.

Band members

Current
 Robert Kodym - vocals, guitar
 Štěpán Smetáček - drums
 Tomáš Vartecký - guitar
 Radek Havlíček - bass guitar

Past
 P.B.CH. - bass guitar
 Martin Vajgl - drums
 Marek Kopecký - drums
 Adolf Vitáček - drums
 Ivan Polák - drums

Discography

Studio albums
 Tak mi to teda nandey (1991)
 Lži, sex & prachy  (1992)
 Andělé (1996)
 333 stříbrnejch stříkaček(1997)
 Hračky (2000)
 Torpédo (2006)
 Letíme na Wenuši (2011)
 Alchymie (2016)

Compilations
 Epidemie (1990)
 Divnoalbum (1993)
 Ty nejlepší věci (2001)
 Best of 20 let (2007)

Singles
 "Vlkodlak" (1997)
 "V princeznách" (1998)
 "Velkej první letní den" (2007)

DVDs
 Best of Wanastowi Vjecy Tour: 20 let (2008)

Other appearances
 "Julie" Šest Křížků (Franta 2017) (František Černý, 2017) - with Lenka Dusilová

References

External links

 
 Unofficial page
 Fan page

Czechoslovak rock music groups
Czech punk rock groups
Czech rock music groups
Czech pop music groups
Musical groups from Prague
Musical groups established in 1988
1988 establishments in Czechoslovakia